Catholic imagination refers to the Catholic viewpoint that God is present in the whole creation and in human beings, as seen in its sacramental system whereby material things and human beings are channels and sources of God's grace.

Etymology

Comparing "Catholic imagination" to "Protestant imagination"
This terminology was popularized by the Roman Catholic priest Andrew Greeley who wrote:

Runar Eldebo, a Swedish seminary instructor and correspondent for Pietisten (an online ecumenical newsletter), provided a Lutheran slant on Greeley's distinction between Catholic imagination and Protestant imagination. Invoking Karl Barth, Eldebo wrote:

American Catholic writer Flannery O'Connor illustrated the sacramental understanding of the world in her work "Novelist and Believer":

Aspects and examples of Catholic imagination

According to Greeley aspects of the Catholic imagination include community, salvation, hierarchy, sacred place/sacred time, and sacred desire. As one reviewer of Greeley's book noted:

Analogical and dialectical discourse
In The Catholic Imagination (2000), Greeley's aim is to "specify how the Catholic imaginative tradition differs from other versions of the Western Christian story." It informs its research through the work of David Tracy, especially The Analogical Imagination: Christian Theology and the Culture of Pluralism (1981). This work suggests a strategy informed by an analogical imagination as an answer to the theological question of how to "form a new and inevitably complex theological strategy that will avoid privatism" in religious discourse that embraces pluralism. Greeley argues that the metaphor inherent in the Catholic imagination is indicative of the necessity to use metaphor in order to relate knowledge generally:

Tracy sees the tendencies of Catholic artists, writers, and theologians to emphasize a metaphorical discourse – and a way to know the world through analogy – versus a Protestant tendency to stress the disconnect inherent in metaphor, as in a dialectical imagination, which Tracy designates as "a necessary corrective to the analogical imagination."

Postmodern and contemporary art
Greeley states:

Body as a medium
Contemporary art critic and art historian Eleanor Heartney addresses these interpretations of the Catholic imagination in her work Postmodern Heretics: The Catholic Imagination in Contemporary Art, bringing to light the complex relationships underlying Catholicism's sacramental vision and the "physically provocative work it seems to inspire." She discusses how sexualization of the spiritual in contemporary art and the adverse reactions it produces – which through the 1980s to today came to be part of what is known as the "culture war" – is affected in some work by a distinctly Catholic imagination. Heartney draws this connection from the work of those artists who grew up as Catholic or were in some way surrounded by Catholicism in their own lives. Emphasis on the body, its fluids, processes, or sexual behaviors as a site of turning cultural stereotype on its head points to a sacramental influence or underpinning that acknowledges the body and its senses as a way to know the world.  She references Greeley and Tracy "to posit the existence of a distinctly Catholic consciousness which is deeply immersed in sensuality and sexuality."

America as dialectical
Heartney questions why the carnal understanding of the world seems to be so inflammatory in American society, and discusses whether this is "peculiarly American". She reveals that in the contemporary United States, the culture war seems to pit artists with the Catholic analogical underpinning "against spokespeople for a 'Christian' (read evangelical) America for whom flesh is a condition to be transcended rather than celebrated."

Complexity of the incarnational imagination
Leo Steinberg's controversial The Sexuality of Christ in Renaissance Art and in Modern Oblivion points out that, "Renaissance Art ... became the first Christian art in a thousand years to confront the Incarnation entire, the upper and the lower body together, not excluding even the body's sexual component." He goes on to reference several works in which Christ's genitals are the focal point of the image, intentionally, so as to counter a heresy denying Christ's humanity.  He indicates that the sexuality of Christ – of God – is indeed within the canon of Catholicism itself. This controversy continues into the contemporary Catholic religion as well, revealing still a deep-seated uneasiness over how fleshly an imagination is too fleshly an imagination.  Greeley makes this point:

Postmodern artists and artists today, influenced by the Catholic imagination, who are using aspects of the body to pose their questions to society, are frequently working out of the inherently complex contradictions of sacramental vision.

List of examples

Brief examples of artists and works of art with reference to a Catholic imagination:

Carolee Schneeman: performance "Meat Joy" (1964)
Dennis Oppenheim: performance "Reading Position for Second Degree Burn" (1970)
Vito Acconci: performance "Trademarks" (1970)
Chris Burdern: performance "Trans-fixed" (1974)
Marina Abromovic: performance "Rhythm 0" (1974)
Linda Montano: performance "One Year Performance" (1983)
Robert Mapplethorpe: photograph "Dennis Spaight with Calla Lilies" (1983)
Karen Finley: performance "We Keep Our Victims Ready" (1990)
Andres Serrano: cibachrome print "The Morgue (Fatal Meningitis II)" (1992)
Ron Athey: performance "Four Scenes in a Harsh Life" (1994)
Sheree Rose and Bob Flanagan: performance "Visiting Hours" (1994)
Renee Cox: photograph "Yo Mama's Last Supper" (1996)
Jeanine Antoni: cibachrome print "Coddle" (1999)
Petah Coyne: mixed media sculpture "Untitled #1093 (s) 02-03 (Buddha Boy)" (2002-2003)

See also: Lisa Yuskavage, Kiki Smith, Andy Warhol, Tim Miller, David Wojnarowicz

See also

 Panentheism
 Sacraments of the Catholic Church
 Theology of the Body

References

Notes

Bibliography

Further reading

 
 
 

Catholic theology and doctrine
Catholic spirituality